The 2008 American National Rugby League season was the 11th season of the competition, the rugby league football competition for semi-professional clubs in the United States.

Results

Final 

The New Haven Warriors won the grand final 50-18 against Aston DSC Bulls
the point  scorers were;

New Haven Warriors 50

Tries: Doeg (4), Carr (2), Roma, Giroux, Robinson

Cons: Carr 7/9

Aston Bulls 18

Tries: Tulio, Stelluti, Stauffer

Cons: Wards 3/3

The 2008 Ladder 

Aston DSC Bulls

New Haven Warriors

Jacksonville Axemen

Connecticut Wildcats

New York Knights

Washington D.C. Slayers

Fairfax Eagles

Bucks County Sharks

Philadelphia Fight

Northern Raiders

American National Rugby League seasons
AMNRL season